This list of museums in the Australia contains lists of museums which are defined for this context as institutions (including nonprofit organizations, government entities, and private businesses) that collect and care for objects of cultural, artistic, scientific, or historical interest and make their collections or related exhibits available for public viewing. Also included are non-profit art galleries and university art galleries.

By state and territory
 List of museums in the Australian Capital Territory
 List of museums in New South Wales
 List of museums in Sydney
 List of museums in the Northern Territory
 List of museums in Queensland
 List of museums in Brisbane
 List of museums in South Australia
 List of museums in Tasmania
 List of museums in Victoria (Australia)
 List of museums in Melbourne
 List of museums in Western Australia

By subject
List of aviation museums in Australia
List of computer museums in Australia
List of contemporary art museums in Australia
List of music museums in Australia
List of Holocaust memorials and museums in Australia
List of natural history museums in Australia
List of open-air and living history museums in Australia
List of railway museums in Australia
List of science museums in Australia
List of transport museums in Australia

See also

 List of Art museums and galleries in Australia
 List of museums

 
List